Phorcidella is a genus of flies in the family Tachinidae.

Species
P. basalis (Baranov, 1932)

References

Diptera of Asia
Exoristinae
Tachinidae genera